Crimes That Shook Australia is an Australian true crime documentary television series that premiered on Crime + Investigation on 16 April 2014. Stan Grant presented the first two series; Matt Doran was announced as the new presenter in February 2017.

Production
As with similar true crime documentaries, Crimes That Shook Australia explores some of Australia's most famous crimes, and details "the events leading up to the crime, the crime itself and its enduring effect on the national consciousness" through interviews, reconstructions and archival footage.

Episodes

Series 1
The first series of six episodes premiered in April 2014.

Series 2
A second series began airing in May 2016.

Series 3
The third series premiered in mid-February 2018.

References

External links
 
 

2010s Australian crime television series
2010s Australian documentary television series
2014 Australian television series debuts
True crime television series